Guangzhou–Zhuhai railway is a railway between  in Guangzhou and  in Zhuhai, via the cities of Foshan and Jiangmen, in Guangdong, China. Opened at the end of 2012, it is currently used for freight only.

Role
Until the 21st century, Zhuhai did not have any railway connections to the rest of the country. Now, however, there are two new railways there: besides the Guangzhou–Zhuhai railway for freight trains, the passenger-only Guangzhou–Zhuhai intercity railway, is a passenger-only line, started construction in 2005 and was to be completed in 2010. Since the intercity rail will take up the role of the passenger service between Guangzhou and Zhuhai/Jiangmen, this can explain why Guangzhou–Zhuhai railway will not be routed via Guangzhou City Area.

History
Map of 2012 Guangzhou-Zhuhai railway route
This railway project was approved by the State Development Planning Commission in 1993. The construction originally started in 1997, but it was stopped later due to lack of funds. Construction was resumed in 2007; at the time, it was expected to be completed in 2011. However, work did not proceeded as fast as expected; as of December 2011, it was reported that although most of the critical components of the project was completed, there was still about 100 m to go at the Jiangmen tunnel (see below), and the Jiangbei Bridge was still under construction.

In mid-October 2012, it was reported that the construction work has been essentially completed. The railway opened for freight traffic on December 30, 2012.

Infrastructure
Between  and Jiangmen, the line is double-track. The entire line is electrified with provisions to allow for operating double-stack container trains.

Jiangmen tunnel
Constructing the railway involved digging a 9185 m long tunnel in Jiangmen. By May 2010, over half of the tunnel had been dug, and the entire tunnel was expected to be completed by the end of February 2011. However, as of December 2011, it was reported that the workers still had about 100 m to go.

Future
The railway is expected to carry passenger services in the future.

Nansha Port railway

A branch from Yayao railway station, the Nansha Port railway, will link the line with Nansha port and will also carry passengers to Nansha railway station.

References

Railway lines in China
Rail transport in Guangdong
Transport in Guangzhou
Nanhai District
Jiangmen
Zhuhai
Railway lines opened in 2012